Safety In Numbers is Umphrey's McGee's fourth studio album, released on April 4, 2006.  Huey Lewis and Joshua Redman both make appearances. The album contains many slower, acoustic songs and a simpler, stripped down approach with little jamming or progressive rock elements. The album title comes from one of the lyrics in the ninth track "Passing".  The artwork for the album was done by Storm Thorgerson.

Track listing
 "Believe the Lie" (Jake Cinninger, Brendan Bayliss, Ryan Stasik, Joel Cummins, Kris Myers, Andy Farag) – 6:56
 "Rocker" (Bayliss, Cinninger) – 5:29
 Chris Hoffman on cello
 "Liquid" (Cinninger) – 3:32
 Mike Racky on pedal steel guitar
 "Words" (Cinninger, Cummins, Bayliss) – 7:08
 "Nemo" (Bayliss) – 4:25
 "Women Wine and Song" (Cinninger) – 3:53
 Huey Lewis on vocals and harmonica
 "Intentions Clear" (Bayliss, Cinninger) – 4:43
 Joshua Redman on saxophone
 "End of the Road" (Cinninger) – 3:16
 Huey Lewis on harmonica
 Chris Hoffman on cello
 "Passing" (Bayliss, Cinninger) – 4:15
 "Ocean Billy" (Bayliss, Cinninger, Cummins, Farag, Myers, Stasik) – 6:37
 "The Weight Around" (Bayliss) – 3:33

Limited Edition Vinyl Bonus Acoustic Tracks
"Memories Of Home" (Cinninger, Cummins) – 4:22
"Divisions" (Bayliss) – 9:54

Chart performance

Personnel
 Brendan Bayliss - guitar, vocals
 Jake Cinninger - guitar, Moog, synthesizers, vocals
 Joel Cummins - keyboards, vocals
 Ryan Stasik - bass guitar
 Kris Myers - drums, vocals
 Andy Farag - percussion

with

 Huey Lewis - guest vocals and harmonica
 Joshua Redman - saxophone

References

Umphrey's McGee albums
2006 albums
Albums with cover art by Storm Thorgerson